George White's 1935 Scandals is an American musical film, written by Jack Yellen and produced in 1935 by Fox Film Corporation. It was a follow-up to (but not a sequel to) the 1934 release, George White's Scandals.

Plot
The film centers on real-life stage and screen producer George White as he gathers acts for his new Broadway revue. At the top of his list is blonde Alice Faye. Also appearing in the film was James Dunn and Cliff Edwards.

George White's 1935 Scandals is best remembered as the major film debut of a young dancer named Eleanor Powell, here performing a "specialty dance". Powell, already a Broadway star, had played bit parts in a couple of films prior to this, but Scandals was her first major film role. According to her introduction to the book Gotta Sing, Gotta Dance, a mix-up in the make-up department resulted in her being made to look almost Egyptian and she left the production so disenchanted with movie-making, she initially rejected a contract offer by MGM that later in the year placed her in the popular Broadway Melody of 1936.

Reportedly, Bill "Bojangles" Robinson filmed a dance routine for this film, but it was cut. Actress Jane Wyman appeared in the film as an uncredited chorine.

Cast
 Alice Faye as Honey Walters
 James Dunn as Eddy Taylor
 Cliff Edwards as Dude Holloway
 Eleanor Powell as Marilyn Collins
 Emma Dunn as Aunt Jane Hopkins
 Arline Judge as Midge Malone
 Ned Sparks as Elmer White
 George White as George White
 The Scandals Beauties as George White's Scandals Beauties
 June Lang as Chorine (uncredited)

External links
 
 

1935 films
Fox Film films
American black-and-white films
1935 musical films
Films directed by Harry Lachman
American musical films
1930s English-language films
1930s American films